Thomas Chandler (August 10, 1772 – January 28, 1866), was an American politician, farmer, and innkeeper who served as United States Representative for New Hampshire.

Early life
Chandler was born on August 10, 1772, in Bedford in the Province of New Hampshire where he attended the public schools, then became a farmer and an innkeeper.

Career
Justice of the peace in 1808 and captain of militia in 1815, Chandler was elected in 1816 as a member of the New Hampshire Senate from the 3rd district, serving from 1817 to 1819.  He was again elected to the state senate in 1824, serving from 1825 to 1828. In 1828, he served in the New Hampshire House of Representatives.

Elected as a Jacksonian Democrat to the Twenty-first and Twenty-second Congresses,  Chandler served from March 4, 1829, to March 3, 1833, as United States Representative for the state of New Hampshire.

Death
Chandler died in Bedford, Hillsborough County, New Hampshire, on January 28, 1866 (age 93 years, 171 days). He is interred at Bedford Cemetery, Bedford, New Hampshire.

Family life
Son of Zachariah and Sarah, Chandler was the uncle of Zachariah Chandler. He married Susanna McAfee and they had three daughters, Asenath, Sally, Hannah, and a son, Adam.

References

External links

The Political Graveyard

Members of the New Hampshire House of Representatives
New Hampshire state senators
People from Bedford, New Hampshire
1772 births
1866 deaths
Jacksonian members of the United States House of Representatives from New Hampshire
19th-century American politicians